Beachheads in Space is an anthology of science fiction stories edited by American writer August Derleth. It was first published by Pellegrini & Cudahy in 1952. Many of the stories had originally appeared in the magazines Astounding Stories, Fantastic Adventures, Science Fiction Adventures, Amazing Stories, Startling Stories, Weird Tales, Planet Stories and Blue Book. Seven of the stories were reprinted again in Derleth's 1964 anthology From Other Worlds.

Contents

 Introduction, by August Derleth
 "The Star", by David H. Keller, M.D.
 "The Man from Outside", by Jack Williamson
 "Beachhead", by Clifford D. Simak
 "The Years Draw Nigh", by Lester del Rey
 "Metamorphosite", by Eric Frank Russell
 "The Ordeal of Professor Klein", by L. Sprague de Camp
 "Repetition", by A. E. van Vogt
 "Breeds There a Man...?", by Isaac Asimov
 "Meteor", by John Beynon
 "And the Walls Came Tumbling Down", by John Wyndham
 "The Blinding Shadows", by Donald Wandrei
 "The Metamorphosis of Earth", by Clark Ashton Smith
 "The Ambassadors from Venus", by Kendell F. Crossen
 "To People a New World", by Nelson S. Bond

Reception
P. Schuyler Miller reported Beachheads in Space to be "a well-done theme collection," saying it was "better than anyone would have thought could still be dredged out of the old files."

References

Sources

1952 anthologies
Science fiction anthologies